"Someday, Someplace" is a song by the Japanese J-pop group Every Little Thing, released as their twelfth single on March 3, 1999.

Track listing
 Someday, Someplace (Words & music - Mitsuru Igarashi) 
 Someday, Someplace (Hal's remix)
 Someday, Someplace (instrumental)

Chart positions

External links
 "Someday, Someplace" information at Avex Network.
 "Someday, Someplace" information at Oricon.

1999 singles
Every Little Thing (band) songs
Songs written by Mitsuru Igarashi
1999 songs
Avex Trax singles